This is a list of songs that topped the Belgian Walloon (francophone) Ultratop 40 in 2001.

See also
2001 in music

References

External links
 Ultratop 40

2001 in Belgium
2001 record charts
2001